Nowy Dwór Mazowiecki , often simply referred to as Nowy Dwór, is a town in east-central Poland with ca. 42500 inhabitants (2008). It is situated in the Masovian Voivodeship (since 1999); previously, it was in Warszawa Voivodeship (1975–1998).  It is the capital of Nowy Dwór County.

History 
One of its districts is Modlin, created from incorporating the former village of Modlin into the growing town in 1961. Modlin Fortress is now also part of the city. Many structures related to the fort can be seen in the Modlin district, including ruins from defensive structures designed by Napoleon Bonaparte and Tsarist Blocks built between 1899–1901 to house soldiers of the Russian army, and which are still in use as private flats today.

The Germans occupied the town beginning in September 1939.  They immediately began to persecute the Jewish population.  Many Jews fled to Warsaw, others to Soviet occupied territory in the east. From 1941–1942, the Germans set up a ghetto between the four streets Nałęcza, Warszawska, Mazowiecka, and Piaskowa. Most of the 9000 or more Jewish inhabitants of the town were murdered.  Some were murdered in the environs of the town; most were sent to Auschwitz concentration camp. Typhus was rampant in the ghetto taking many lives there. Only about 400 Nowy Dwor Jews survived; most of the survivors had fled to Soviet occupied territory and later to the Soviet Union itself, where they stayed throughout the war. Holocaust survivor Yehudis Pshenitse has recounted the efforts of a parish priest from Nowy Dwór to save her life after the murder of more than 2000 Jews in Rembertów ghetto in August 1942. Hiding her in his cellar, he gave her false papers identifying her as a Christian. Betrayed to the German occupying forces, the priest was tortured. He was released, but mortally wounded. Pshenitse described how he blessed her before dying: "Once again, he asked [his housekeeper] that I be hidden in a safe place, and then he died." The housekeeper took her to Modlin, where she was able to survive, living "by her own wits, posing as a Christian child."<ref>'Wanderings of a Child' in Pinkas Novy-Dvor (the Nowy Dwór Memorial Book).  Quoted in Kugelmass, Jack and Jonathan Boyarin (1983) (translator and editors) From a Ruined Garden: The Memorial Book of Polish Jewry.  New York: Schocken Books, 177 - 8</ref>

The Israeli city of Holon has a Nowy Dwór Street (רחוב נובידבור). The name was given at the request of survivors of the Nowy Dwór Jewish community, who arrived in Holon after 1945.

Nowy Dwór Mazowiecki is also renowned for its wooden architecture, which is still faintly visible within the city limits. Some of the wooden houses and villas date back to the late 18th century. The name Nowy Dwór'' itself, which literally means "New Manor" in English, relates to the manor-like architecture of the region.

Sports 

 Świt Nowy Dwór - football team (1st league in season 2003/2004)

See also 
Modlin Airport
 Modlin Fortress

References

External links
 Jewish Community in Nowy Dwór Mazowiecki on Virtual Shtetl
 Memorial book of Nowy-Dwor (published by former Jewish residents of Nowy Dwór Mazowieck in 1965)

Gallery

Cities and towns in Masovian Voivodeship
Nowy Dwór Mazowiecki County
Warsaw Governorate
Warsaw Voivodeship (1919–1939)